Pelecopselaphus is a genus of beetles in the family Buprestidae, containing the following species:

 Pelecopselaphus acutus Saunders, 1874
 Pelecopselaphus angularis (Schönherr, 1817)
 Pelecopselaphus basalis Kerremans, 1899
 Pelecopselaphus blandus (Fabricius, 1781)
 Pelecopselaphus ceibae Westcott, 2000
 Pelecopselaphus chevrolatii Saunders, 1874
 Pelecopselaphus curtus Thomson, 1878
 Pelecopselaphus frontalis Waterhouse, 1882
 Pelecopselaphus lateralis Waterhouse, 1882
 Pelecopselaphus purpureomarginatus Lotte, 1937
 Pelecopselaphus strandi Obenberger, 1924
 Pelecopselaphus strictus (Linnaeus, 1758)
 Pelecopselaphus viridiventris Cobos, 1957

References

Buprestidae genera